Butroxydim is a chemical used as a herbicide. It is a group A herbicide used to kill grass weeds in a range of broadacre crops. Structurally related herbicides against grasses are alloxydim, sethoxydim, clethodim, and cycloxydim.

References

Hydroxylamines
Ketones
Imines
Herbicides